Acacia quinquenervia is a shrub of the genus Acacia and the subgenus Phyllodineae that is endemic to south western Australia

Description
The branchelts are usually densely haired and like most species of Acacia it has phyllodes rather than true leaves. The thinly coriaceous-crustaceous seed pods are glabrous to moderately hairy with longitudinally arranged seeds inside.

Taxonomy
The species was first formally described by the botanist Bruce Maslin in 1999 as part of the work Acacia miscellany. The taxonomy of fifty-five species of Acacia, primarily Western Australian, in section Phyllodineae (Leguminosae: Mimosoideae) as published in the journal Nuytsia. It was reclassified as Racosperma quinquenervium by Leslie Pedley in 2003 then transferred back to genus Acacia in 2006.
The specific epithet (quinquenervia) is from the Latin quinque meaning "five" and nervus, "vein", referring to the leaves usually having five veins.

Distribution
It is native to an area in the Wheatbelt and Goldfields-Esperance regions of Western Australia where it is commonly situated on flats and undulating plains growing in sandy, clay or loamy soils. It has a scattered distribution from around Nyabing in the south west to around Peak Charles National Park in the north east where it is usually a part of low Eucalyptus woodlands or open mallee shrubland communities.

See also
List of Acacia species

References

quinquenervia
Acacias of Western Australia
Taxa named by Bruce Maslin
Plants described in 1999